Ben Belitt (May 2, 1911 – August 17, 2003) was an American poet and translator. Besides writing poetry, he also translated several books of poetry by Pablo Neruda and Federico García Lorca from Spanish to English.

Life
Belitt was born in New York City. He was educated at the University of Virginia, receiving a B.A. in 1932 and an M.A. in 1934, and he was a doctoral student at that university from 1934 to 1936. By the early 1940s, he had taken up an appointment at Bennington College in Bennington, Vermont, where he remained, living in a former firehouse in North Bennington, for the rest of his life. A bachelor, he became a good friend of the dancer (and fellow teacher at Bennington) Bill Bales, of his wife Jo Van Fleet, and of their son Michael Bales, and regularly spent holidays with this family at Bennington or in New York City.

Career
Belitt was the author of eight books of poems; his complete poems This Scribe, My Hand,was published in 1998 by Louisiana State University Press. He wrote two books of essays and over thirteen books of translations. He taught for many decades at Bennington College. After retiring from Bennington College, he continued to live in North Bennington, Vermont and held the position of Professor Emeritus of Language and Literature at the college. He died in Bennington on August 17, 2003 at the age of 92 and was buried in Manchester, Vermont.

His papers are held by the University of Virginia.

Influence
The 1962 ballet A Look at Lightning, by the American choreographer Martha Graham was titled after a poem by Belitt. Errand into the Maze, also by Graham, takes its title from a Belitt poem as well.

Books

As author
The Five-Fold Mesh. New York: Alfred A. Knopf, 1938.
Wilderness Stair: Poems, 1938-1954. New York: Grove Press, 1955.
The Enemy Joy: New and Selected Poems. Chicago: University of Chicago Press, 1964.
Nothing But Light: Poems, 1964-1969. Chicago: University of Chicago Press, 1970.
The Double Witness: Poems, 1970-1976. Princeton: Princeton University Press, 1977.
Possessions, New and Selected Poems, 1938 - 1985. New York: David Godine, 1986. .
This Scribe, My Hand: The Complete Poems of Ben Belitt. Baton Rouge: Louisiana State University Press, 1998. . .

As translator
 García Lorca, Federico (1955). Poet in New York
García Lorca, Federico (1963). Joy of the Day
García Lorca, Federico (1964). Ode to Salvador Dalí
Neruda, Pablo (1961). Selected Poems Edited and translated by Ben Belitt. Introduction by Luis Monguió.
Neruda, Pablo (1963). Poems for the Mind
Neruda, Pablo (1972). New Poems (1968-1970) (Grove Press)

Recordings
c. 1965 - Belitt, Ben. The Poetry of Ben Belitt. Recorded at the Poetry Center of the New York YM-YWHA in November 1965. Audio cassette. Audio Forum series. New York: Jeffrey Norton.

Awards
1937: Belitt shared the Shelley Memorial Award for Poetry for 1936-1937 with Charlotte Wilder.

References

External links
Ben Belitt Translations
The Complete Poems of Ben Belitt
In Memoriam: Ben Belitt, 1911-2003
Richard Eberhart, New York Times Book Review review of Possessions: New and Selected Poems, 1938-1985

Poets from New York (state)
American translators
1911 births
2003 deaths
People from Bennington, Vermont
Bennington College faculty
University of Virginia alumni
20th-century American poets
20th-century translators
American male poets
Federico García Lorca
LGBT people from Vermont
20th-century American male writers